These Men (Spanish: ¡Esos hombres!) is a 1937 Mexican comedy drama film directed by Rolando Aguilar and starring Adriana Lamar, Arturo de Córdova and Marina Tamayo.

Cast
 Adriana Lamar as Azucena  
 Arturo de Córdova as Fernando de la Peña  
 Marina Tamayo as Juana  
 Luis G. Barreiro as Don Panchito  
 Emma Roldán as Doña María 
 Manuel Noriega as José 
 María Fernanda Ibáñez as Lilí  
 Maria Berlini as María  
 José Eduardo Pérez as Ramón  
 Alejandro Galindo as Vecino  
 Maria del Pilar Alvarez as Domitila  
 Elvira Ríos as Cantante

References

Bibliography 
 Andrew Grant Wood. Agustin Lara: A Cultural Biography. OUP USA, 2014.

External links 
 

1937 films
1937 comedy-drama films
Mexican comedy-drama films
1930s Spanish-language films
Films directed by Rolando Aguilar
Mexican black-and-white films
1930s Mexican films